John Stewart Collis (6 February 1900 – 2 March 1984) was an Irish biographer, rural author, and pioneer of the ecology movement. He is known for his book The Worm Forgives the Plough based on his wartime experience working in the Land Army in the Second World War.

Early life, biographer

The son of an Irish solicitor, Collis was born at Kilmore, Killiney on the borders of County Dublin and County Wicklow, Ireland. He was educated at Bray preparatory school, Rugby School and Balliol College, Oxford. At the Oxford Union he learnt the art of public speaking, hearing politicians and authors including H. H. Asquith, G. K. Chesterton, Lloyd George and W. B. Yeats in the debating chamber. In the 1920s he became a close friend of the Guernsey-born G.B. Edwards, who lodged at his flat in Guildford Street. Both men became protégés of John Middleton Murry and contributed to The Adelphi magazine but later drifted apart. Collis, however, wrote an enthusiastic review of Edwards's The Book of Ebenezer Le Page in the Spectator when this novel was posthumously published in 1981.

Collis's first book, a biography of George Bernard Shaw, was published in 1925, followed by biographies of Havelock Ellis, August Strindberg, Leo Tolstoy, the Carlyles and Christopher Columbus.

Country writing

Collis is remembered largely for While Following the Plough (1946) and Down to Earth (1947: as one volume, The Worm Forgives the Plough, 1973).

While Following the Plough was inspired by the years he chose to spend working as a farm labourer in the Land Army (which mainly consisted of women, known as "land girls") in Sussex and Dorset during the Second World War. He worked at J. G. Maynard's farm at Stonegate in Sussex in 1940 for a year, and then moved to Tarrant Hinton in Dorset for the rest of the war. The manuscript of the book was rejected by twelve publishers. At last, Jonathan Cape accepted it, but requested much revision. Collis waited for a while and returned the manuscript largely unchanged, thanking the publisher for their suggestions; Jonathan Cape answered saying they were "delighted with the improvements".

Down to Earth was inspired by the year he spent working for Rolf Gardiner after the war, thinning a fourteen-acre wood on his own, using only an axe and other hand tools.

Reception

The novelist Margaret Drabble states that Collis wrote with imagination and authenticity about rural life, and that Collis's autobiography Bound upon a Course brought him belated recognition as a pioneer in the ecology movement.

The travel writer Robert Macfarlane praises his country writing as follows:

The biographer Michael Holroyd comments that While Following the Plough and Down to Earth were "acclaimed on their appearance", and are now considered classics.

Family

The writer and paediatrician Robert Collis was his twin and Maurice Collis, writer and biographer, was his elder brother.

Legacy

In 1986 Richard Ingrams wrote John Stewart Collis: A Memoir (Chatto & Windus). A 2009 edition of The Worm Forgives the Plough, with an introduction by Robert Macfarlane, was issued by Vintage Classics.

Bibliography

Individual Works

 Shaw (1925)
 Forward to Nature (1927)
 Farewell to Argument (1935)
 The Sounding Cataract (1936)
 An Irishman's England (1937)
 While Following the Plough (1946)
 Down to Earth (1947)
 The Triumph of the Tree (1950)
 The Moving Waters (1955)
 Paths of Light (UK, 1959) / The World of Light (US, 1960)
 An Artist of Life (1959)
 Marriage and Genius: Strindberg and Tolstoy, Studies in Tragi-Comedy (1963)
 Leo Tolstoy (1969)
 Bound upon a Course: An Autobiography (1971)
 The Carlyles (1971)
 Christopher Columbus (1976)
 Living with a Stranger (1978)

Omnibus Editions

 The Vision of Glory (1972), containing selections from —
 The Triumph of the Tree
 The Moving Waters
 Paths of Light
 The Worm Forgives the Plough (1973)
 While Following the Plough
 Down to Earth

References

1900 births
1984 deaths
English biographers
People from Killiney
English nature writers
20th-century biographers
English male non-fiction writers
20th-century English male writers